Norman John McPherson (25 August 1907 – 24 May 1976) was an  Australian rules footballer who played with South Melbourne in the Victorian Football League (VFL).

Notes

External links 

1907 births
1976 deaths
Australian rules footballers from Victoria (Australia)
Sydney Swans players
Castlemaine Football Club players